Enigma is an unincorporated community in Smith County, in the U.S. state of Tennessee.

History
A post office was established at Enigma in 1882, and remained in operation until 1905. According to tradition, the community was named for a feud or "enigma" between locals over the use of a church.

References

Unincorporated communities in Smith County, Tennessee
Unincorporated communities in Tennessee